Eastern Province was an electorate of the Victorian Legislative Council,  
Victoria being a colony in the continent of Australia at the time.

It was one of the six original Provinces of the bi-cameral Legislative Council created in November 1856.

Its area was defined in the Victoria Constitution Act of 1855 as 

Eastern Province was abolished by the Legislative Council Act of 1881 (taking effect at the November 1882 elections).

Eastern Province was replaced by the new provinces of North Eastern and Gippsland of three members each.

Members for Eastern Province
These were members of the upper house province of the Victorian Legislative Council.

After Eastern Province was abolished in 1882, Anderson and Wallace went on to represent North Eastern from 1882; Dougharty, McCulloch  and Pearson went on to represent Gippsland.

References

Former electoral provinces of Victoria (Australia)
1856 establishments in Australia
1882 disestablishments in Australia